Gymnasura is a genus of moth in the family Erebidae.

Species
Gymnasura costaesignata (Gaede, 1925)
Gymnasura dentiferoides Rothschild, 1915
Gymnasura flavia (Hampson, 1900)
Gymnasura pallida (Rothschild, 1913)
Gymnasura prionosticha (Turner, 1940)
Gymnasura rhodina (Rothschild & Jordan, 1905)
Gymnasura saginaea (Turner, 1899)
Gymnasura semilutea (Wileman, 1911)

References
Natural History Museum Lepidoptera generic names catalog

Nudariina
Moth genera